South Dakota Public Universities and Research Center, also known as University Center, is a cooperative higher education delivery system in Sioux Falls, South Dakota. Six universities offer classes at this site: University of South Dakota, Dakota State University, South Dakota State University, Black Hills State University, South Dakota School of Mines and Technology, and Northern State University. The site, until recently known as "USDSU," has become popular with non-traditional students living in or around Sioux Falls.

In 2006, the South Dakota Board of Regents received authorization to obtain a large area in Sioux Falls to construct a new campus for its Sioux Falls offerings.

University Center will become a college of the University of South Dakota named "The Community College for Sioux Falls, a branch of USD", a change approved by the Board of Regents in April 2019.

External links

References 

 
Education in Sioux Falls, South Dakota